The Wadi Qelt Synagogue is the name given by some to a building controversially identified by its excavator, archaeologist Ehud Netzer, as a Hasmonean-period synagogue. It is part of the royal winter palace complex built by the Hasmoneans in the warm desert oasis of Jericho, west of the town proper. It dates from between 70 and 50 BCE, and if it did indeed serve as a synagogue, it would be one of the oldest synagogues ever found.

The synagogue was discovered during a dig led by Ehud Netzer.

The synagogue was a modest building of stone and sun-baked brick. It included a ritual bath and a small courtyard surrounded by seven or eight rooms with a rectangular main hall measuring 53 by 37 feet. The hall was bordered by a colonnade, the platform of which was nearly two feet above the floor of the nave. This provided seating for nearly 70 people. In the northeastern corner, Netzer found a niche that may have served as a Torah Ark. A lower compartment, mostly intact, is thought to have possibly functioned as a genizah or storage compartment where old or unused scrolls were stored. Adjacent to the western side of the main hall was a triclinium, or dining hall, where public meals could be held, and a small, triangular space that may have been used as a kitchen. The triclinium was added some years after the main hall was built. Diners reclined, Roman style, on benches against three walls of the chamber while eating. The floors and walls were covered with white plaster.

Controversy
Despite the excavator's identification of a building among the Hasmonean palatial complex near Wadi Qelt as a synagogue, the matter is far from conclusive. In fact, few scholars seriously consider this suggestion in discussions of Second Temple period synagogues, though even fewer have openly challenged the identification in print.

See also
 Jericho synagogue
 List of oldest synagogues
 Ancient synagogues in Israel

References

Former synagogues
Archaeological sites in the West Bank
Synagogues in the West Bank
Ancient synagogues in the Land of Israel
Buildings and structures in Jericho
1st-century BC establishments in the Hasmonean Kingdom